Lough Arrow is a freshwater lake in the northwest of Ireland. It is a popular trout fishing lake.

Geography
The Bricklieve Mountains rise west of the lake.

The lake has four islands: Annaghgowla, Inishmore, Inishbeg and Muck.

Hydrology
Lough Arrow is a mesotrophic lake. It is fed mainly by springs but also by a number of streams entering on the lake's western and southern sides. The lake drains north into the Unshin River.

Natural history
Fish present in Lough Arrow include brown trout, perch, roach, three-spined stickleback, pike, rudd, bream and the critically endangered European eel. A number of duck species winter at the lake including mallard, wigeon, teal, red-breasted merganser, tufted duck, pochard and goldeneye. Other bird species found at the lake include great crested grebe, little grebe, cormorant and mute swan.

Lough Arrow has been designated a Special Area of Conservation as a hard water lake habitat.

History
A number of important historical sites are located in the area around Lough Arrow. Carrowkeel Megalithic Cemetery is located in the Bricklieve Mountains above the lake's western side. It is one of the most extensive and best preserved complexes of the Irish Passage Tomb Tradition. Moytura, located on the eastern side of the lake, features standing stones and is also the site of the mythological Second Battle of Moytura.

See also
List of loughs in Ireland

References

External links 

Arrow
Arrow